An air pollution episode is an unusual combination of emissions and meteorology that gives rise to high levels of air pollution over a large area.  Examples of air pollution episodes include:
1930 Meuse Valley Episode
1939 Saint Louis Episode
 1948 Donora Episode
 1952 London Episode
 1997 Indonesian forest fires Episode
 2005 Malaysian Haze Episode
 2006 Southeast Asian Haze Episode
 1984 Bhopal Gas Tragedy Episode

See also
Smog, Haze, Ozone, PM2.5, Air Pollution, Inversion

References

Atmosphere of Earth